Desoutter is a British monoplane liaison aircraft manufactured by Desoutter Aircraft Company at Croydon Aerodrome, Surrey.

Design and production
In the late 1920s, Marcel Desoutter, a well known pilot, formed the Desoutter Aircraft Company Ltd to follow up his marketing idea to licence manufacture the Dutch aircraft Koolhoven F.K.41. This aircraft had drawn a lot of attention due to its modern design. The licence was obtained and Desoutter began production at Croydon Aerodrome in the former ADC Aircraft factory.

The second production Dutch F.K.41 (registered G-AAGC) was flown to Croydon and was modified by Desoutter and displayed at the Olympia Aero Show, London in July 1929 as the Desoutter Dolphin.  This aircraft was later sold in South Africa with registration ZS-ADX and was impressed into service with the South African Air Force.

The name Dolphin was not used again and the British production aircraft was known as the Desoutter and then following the introduction of an improved version the following year the Desoutter I. The National Flying Services Ltd placed a large order and received 19 aircraft.  These were all painted black and bright orange and soon became a familiar sight at British flying clubs, where they were used for instruction, pleasure flights and taxi flights. The first aircraft for another customer left Croydon for New Zealand on 9 February 1930. It was flown to Sydney, Australia arriving on 13 March 1930, it was then shipped to New Zealand.

In 1930 an improved version, the Desoutter II was produced. It had a de Havilland Gipsy III engine, redesigned ailerons and tail surfaces and wheel brakes.

Operational history

Production
41 aircraft were built at Croydon Aerodrome – 28 Mk.Is and 13 Mk.IIs, in contrast only six of the original F.K.41 were produced.

New Zealand
The Desoutter also became famous due to its involvement in New Zealand's first commercial air disaster, which occurred six days after the 1931 Hawke's Bay earthquake on 8 February 1931 near Wairoa.  The Desoutter belonged to Dominion Airways and carried the identification code ZK-ACA. The small airliner had been making three round trips a day between Hastings and Gisborne, carrying passengers and supplies. All three on board were killed.

Australia
Late in 1931 Australians H. Jenkins and H. Jeffrey purchased the 30th production aircraft EI-AAD from Irish owners Iona National Air Taxis and flew it as G-ABOM from Heston Aerodrome to Sydney between 29 December 1931 and February 1932.  Here it was soon sold to L. MacKenzie Johnson as VH-UEE Miss Flinders who began a regular service between Launceston and Whitemark on Flinders Island, most of the 108-mile route being over the waters of south-eastern Bass Strait.  Competition with regular shipping services by William Holyman & Sons saw the formation of Holymans Airways, the forerunners of Australian National Airways, later the same year.  VH-UEE has been preserved by the Queen Victoria Museum in Launceston.

Three other Desoutter IIs were purchased by Hart Aviation Services of Melbourne, including the still-extant VH-UPR (damaged in an accident on Deal Island in Bass Strait in 1933). VH-UPR is now located at the Nhill aerodrome in country Victoria

Denmark
The Danish Air Society (Det Danske Luftfartselskab) bought the second last manufactured Desoutter Mk.II in 1931. This aircraft was given the registration OY-DOD. In 1934, this aircraft was sold to lieutenant Michael Hansen, and in the following year to the Nordisk Luftrafik company. In 1938 it was sold to Nordjysk Aero Service, but Michael Hansen bought the aircraft back the same year and used it to fly to Cape Town and in the MacRobertson Air Race. The aircraft completed the journey from Mildenhall, England to Melbourne, Australia in 129 Hours 47 Minutes, it gained 7th position in the handicap race.

Finland
During the Winter War, the Red Cross of Denmark raised money in order to purchase an ambulance aircraft for Finland. In October 1941 the Danish aircraft registered OY-DOD was bought for this purpose and was donated to Finland. The aircraft was flown by Michael Hansen to Helsinki, Finland on 28 October 1941. The Mk.II was given both Finnish Air Force and Red Cross markings and was used until 14 November 1944 as a liaison and ambulance aircraft. After the war, the Karhumäki brothers, who were aircraft manufacturers, bought the aircraft and sold it without the engine to Torsti Tallgren and Armas Jylhä in Tampere, who repaired it and registered it as OH-TJA on 17 November 1947. The aircraft crashed near Tampere on 4 December 1947.

Variants
Koolhoven F.K.41 Original Dutch version, six built, powered variously by  ADC Cirrus,  Siemens-Halske Sh 11, or any suitable engine in the  range
Desoutter Dolphin One Desoutter modified F.K.41
Desoutter Mk.I (previously known as the Desoutter for a few months) – British licence-made version.  Modified tail, powered by Cirrus Hermes engine, 28 built.
Desoutter Mk.II (Sports Coupé) Modified version of the Mk.I with new inverted engine, redesigned vertical rudder and windscreen, 13 built.

Surviving aircraft
Three of the 41 aircraft survive:
 G-AAPZ a flyable Desoutter I is operated by the Shuttleworth Trust, Old Warden, England.
 VH-UEE is on display at the Queen Victoria Museum in Launceston, Australia.
 VH-UPR is a flyable Desoutter II owned by the Australian National Aviation Museum in Melbourne Australia

Operators

Civil operators

 The Danish airliner Det Danske Luftfarssselskab (DDL; 1932–1934; OY-DOD)
 Dutch East Indies

 South Africa

Military operators
 Finnish Air Force (Desoutter II, ex-Danish OY-DOD given by the Danish Red Cross)
 South African Air Force (F.K.41)
 Royal Air Force (Desoutter I and II)

Specifications (Mk.II)

See also

References

Bibliography

 Kalevi Keskinen, Kari Stenman: Koulukoneet – Suomen ilmavoimien historia 22, Itä-Uudenmaan paino, Loviisa, 2003, 
 Tervonen, Ismo: Veljekset Karhumäki Suomen ilmailun pioneereina 1924–1956, Apali Oy, .
 Timo Heinonen: Thulinista Hornetiin – Keski-Suomen ilmailumuseon julkaisuja 3, 1992. 
 Ove Hermansen: Da Hansen fløj til Melbourne i '34 – 75-året for dansk deltagelse i verdens største flykapløb fra England til Australien, Copenhagen: Dansk Flyvehistorisk Forening, 2009.

External links

  edcoatescollection

1930s British civil utility aircraft
High-wing aircraft
Desoutter aircraft
Single-engined tractor aircraft
Aircraft first flown in 1930